Robert Francis Cornish  (Chinese: 鄺富劭, born 18 May 1942) was a British diplomat who previously served as the Foreign Office spokesman for Douglas Hurd, Senior Trade Commissioner to Hong Kong (until 1997), Consul-General to Hong Kong and Macao (July to November 1997), head of the Foreign and Commonwealth Office's news department, and Ambassador to Israel (1998 to 2001).

Biography

Early life 
Cornish was born on 18 May 1942 in England, Britain and educated at the Charterhouse and the Royal Military Academy Sandhurst. In 1960, he began service with the British Army and was commissioned into the 14th/20th King's Hussars in 1962, and later joined the Foreign and Commonwealth Office (ECO) in 1968. From 1968 to 1969, he work with the Foreign and Commonwealth Office (FCO).

Diplomatic career 
Cornish began his diplomatic career in several countries which include Malaysia in 1970 and Indonesia from 1971 to 1973. Posted to London from 1973 to 1976, then serving as the First Secretary at the British Embassy in Bonn, Germany from 1976 to 1980. Under the Prince of Wales, he would become his Assistant Deputy Secretary from 1980 to 1983. On 6 November 1983, he was appointed as the British High Commissioner to Brunei. He would vacate the colonial mansion where British officials have managed Brunei's affairs as a sign of independence. Nonetheless, a British Gurkha battalion will stay in the nation for a further five years to support the national defense. From 1986 to 1990, he became the Counsellor in Washington, and Head of British Information Services in New York.

Cornish became the Head of News Department from 1990 to 1993, and from 1993 to 1997, he was the Senior Trade Commissioner in Hong Kong. From July to November 1997, he held the position of Consul-General to Hong Kong and Macao. In 1998, he would then be appointed as the British Ambassador to Israel until 2001.

Cornish had other diplomatic and royal postings:

 Spokesman to the Foreign Secretary Douglas Hurd
 Handover transition advisor to Governor Chris Patten

Later life 
Cornish was chairman of South West Tourism (2003–2009) and is now chairman of the Taunton Town Centre Company and has a smallholding in the Quantocks.

Honours 
In 1983, he was appointed as a Member of the Royal Victorian Order (MVO), it would then upgraded to Lieutenant (LVO) in 1978. In 1994, he would be given the Companion of the Order of St Michael and St George (CMG).

  Order of St Michael and St George Companion (CMG) – (1994)
  Royal Victorian Order Lieutenant (LVO) – (1978)

References

1942 births
Living people
People educated at Charterhouse School
Consuls-General of the United Kingdom in Hong Kong
Ambassadors of the United Kingdom to Israel
High Commissioners of the United Kingdom to Brunei